Lake Everett is a lake in Allen County, Indiana. The lake is about 42 acres and most of the land surrounding it is privately owned. Several small and a few larger cottages(some recently built) are located on the lake proper. The Indiana DNR maintains a beach, dock, and boat ramp on the lake. Lake Everett is held to be one of the area's best pan fishing locations. The lake is roughly twelve miles from Fort Wayne, Indiana with its major shopping and business center in NE Indiana. Fort Wayne has a hub airport, Fort Wayne International,  with national & international service available and a general aviation airport(Smith Field). Both are located in or at The Fort Wayne city limits. Fort Wayne International Airport also houses the Indiana Air National Guard's local squadron Currently flying A-10 Warthogs.

Lake Everett was named for Charles Everett, an early landowner.

References

Everett
Lakes of Allen County, Indiana